Steuben Township is one of twelve townships in Steuben County, Indiana, United States. As of the 2010 census, its population was 2,835 and it contained 1,385 housing units.

History
The Cornish Griffin Round Barn and Pleasant Lake Depot are listed on the National Register of Historic Places.

Geography
Lakes in this township include Bower Lake, Golden Lake, Gooseneck Lake, Jonley Lake, Little Bower Lake, Long Lake, Meserve Lake, Mink Lake, Mud Lake, Perfect Lake, Pleasant Lake, Reed Lakes and Tamarack Lake. The stream of Mud Creek runs through this township.

Cities and towns
 Ashley (northeast quarter)
 Hudson (northeast half)

Unincorporated towns
 Moonlight at 
 Pleasant Lake at 
 Steubenville at 
(This list is based on USGS data and may include former settlements.)

Adjacent townships
 Pleasant Township (north)
 Scott Township (northeast)
 Otsego Township (east)
 Franklin Township, DeKalb County (southeast)
 Smithfield Township, DeKalb County (south)
 Fairfield Township, DeKalb County (southwest)
 Salem Township (west)
 Jackson Township (northwest)

Cemeteries
The township contains three cemeteries: Matson, Mount Zion and Pleasant Lake.

Major highways
  Interstate 69

References
 U.S. Board on Geographic Names (GNIS)
 United States Census Bureau cartographic boundary files

External links

 Indiana Township Association
 United Township Association of Indiana

Townships in Steuben County, Indiana
Townships in Indiana